David Clark Brewster (born September 26, 1939) is an American journalist and the founder, editor and publisher of the Seattle Weekly and the Northwest news website Crosscut.com. He is also the founder, creator and former executive director of the nonprofit cultural center Town Hall Seattle.

Biography

Early life

He was born on September 26, 1939 in Newark, New Jersey, the son of Gaylord Clark Brewster,  His father was a 1930 graduate of the University of Nebraska and Marjorie Jane Anderson.

He was born into a family with Midwestern roots that traces back directly to Mayflower passengers, Love Brewster, a founder of the town of Bridgewater, Massachusetts; Elder William Brewster, the Pilgrim colonist leader and spiritual elder of the Plymouth Colony; and William Bradford, Governor of the Plymouth Colony and the second signer and primary architect of the Mayflower Compact in Provincetown Harbor.

Education

He graduated in 1961, Phi Beta Kappa,  with a Bachelor of Arts from Yale University in New Haven, Connecticut and he received  his Master's Degree from Yale University in 1963.

Family
In 1962, he married Joyce Skaggs, a 1961 graduate of Smith College. She was a writer for the Office of University Relations in the President's Office, at the University of Washington in Seattle, Washington. She retired from that position in 2008. She is the daughter of Charles Skaggs and Juanita ("Nita") Allen.  David and Joyce are the parents of two daughters, Kate Eliza Brewster and Anne Olivia Brewster.

Career

After graduating from Yale, he moved to Seattle in 1965 to teach English at the University of Washington. He left teaching after a couple of years to write for the Seattle Times, Argus magazine, and Seattle Magazine, then an arm of King Broadcasting. He was also an assignment editor for KING-TV.

Brewster was founding editor of the Seattle Weekly, which first published on March 31, 1976, celebrating the dedication of the Kingdome and the return of Major League Baseball to Seattle. Attorney Doug Raff and arts patron Bagley Wright were investors (investing $100,000) at start up (The Wright family eventually became the largest, though a minority holding, owners of the Weekly until it was sold in 1997). The free weekly paper focused on covering Seattle arts, culture and politics. He sold the paper 21 years later to Village Voice Publications for an unannounced sum.

Eastside Week, a Seattle Weekly spinoff, put the spotlight on Seattle suburbia. A political reporter named Rob French introduced readers to a new group of youthful conservatives – John Carlson, Kirby Wilbur, and others – who have been the nucleus of this state's political opposition for the past two decades.

He also originated the "Best Places" guidebook series covering Northwest (northern California to Alaska) dining, lodging and getaways. The series is published by Sasquatch Books.

He also jumped into the local Seattle political scene in the 1977 mayor's race, promoting Paul Schell (he lost that year to Charles Royer). Schell, a well-connected developer and former dean of the University of Washington School of Architecture, (now known as the University of Washington College of Built Environments) was touted as gubernatorial timber and U.S. Senate material. Ultimately, he did get elected mayor – in 1997, after the Weekly had been sold and had endorsed Charlie Chong.

His latest venture is Crosscut.com, which specializes in coverage of the Northwest, originating its own stories out of the region but also shining a light on worthy journalism and Web sites. He announced in November 2008 that the commercial venture into the world of Web journalism was shifting to nonprofit status, due to slow growth in online advertising and the current low rates for such ads.

He transformed a former Christian Science church in the First Hill neighborhood in Seattle, into a civic crossroads hosting chamber music, best-selling authors, dialogue on national issues and presidential candidates. Town Hall Seattle became a springboard for the Bill Bradley presidential campaign in 2000. In 2004, Howard Dean drew large crowds, but they didn't translate into caucus votes. Slate magazine founder Michael Kinsley referred to it as "The Church of David Brewster."

He was President of the English Pub Association, Inc., which operated the Mark Tobey Pub in the 1980s; and a member of the board of directors of numerous arts organizations.

Brewster is currently the Executive Director of Folio: The Seattle Anthenaeum, a private independent library in downtown Seattle which was founded in 2014.

Notes

References

Sources
Berlin, Leslie The man behind the microchip: Robert Noyce and the invention of Silicon Valley  Publisher Oxford University Press US, 2005 
Burt, Daniel S. The chronology of American literature: America's literary achievements from the colonial era to modern times Houghton Mifflin Harcourt, 2004. 
Jones, Emma C. Brewster. The Brewster Genealogy, 1566–1907: a Record of the Descendants of William Brewster of the "Mayflower," ruling elder of the Pilgrim church which founded Plymouth Colony in 1620. New York: Grafton Press, 1908.

Further reading
Gaylord,  Mrs. Mary M. Welles. Life and Labors of Rev. Reuben Gaylord Omaha: Rees Printing Company, 1889.
Jones, Emma C. Brewster. The Brewster Genealogy, 1566–1907: a Record of the Descendants of William Brewster of the "Mayflower," ruling elder of the Pilgrim church which founded Plymouth Colony in 1620. New York: Grafton Press, 1908.

External links

Crosscut
Seattle Weekly
Town Hall Seattle

Living people
Yale University alumni
1939 births
American male journalists